Mike Estabrook may refer to:

 Mike Estabrook (artist) (born 1970), American visual artist
 Mike Estabrook (umpire) (born 1976), Major League Baseball umpire